The 1913 Cincinnati football team was an American football team that represented the University of Cincinnati as a member of the Ohio Athletic Conference during the 1913 college football season. In their second and final season under head coach Lowell Dana, the team compiled a 5–3–1 record (4–2–1 against conference opponents). Clement Fenker was the team captain. The team played its home games at Carson Field in Cincinnati.

Schedule

References

Cincinnati
Cincinnati Bearcats football seasons
Cincinnati football